Warlaing is a commune in the Nord department in northern France.

Heraldry

Population

Sites and monuments

Church of our Lady of the Assumption, built around 1852 by Lille architect Charles Leroy, who was the designer of many religious buildings in northern France, including the Notre-Dame de la Treille cathedral.
The Château de Warlaing, now in ruins, was destroyed by the armies of Louis XIV.
The Scarpe, its lock and bridge.

See also
Communes of the Nord department

References

Communes of Nord (French department)
French Flanders